Carlo Alfonso Nallino (18 February 1872 – 25 July 1938) was an Italian orientalist.

Biography
Nallino was born in Turin, and studied literature under Italo Pizzi at the University of Turin.  From 1896 he taught in the Istituto Universitario Orientale of Naples and then at the University of Palermo (1902–1913). By the age of 21 Nallino had gained an international reputation for his publication of an Arabic manuscript by the celebrated tenth-century Arab astronomer al-Battānī.

With his publication of a book on Egyptian Arab dialect in 1900 he was invited by King Fuad I of Egypt to teach at the Egyptian Khedive University. Amongst his pupils there was Taha Husayn, who would go on to become Minister of the Education.

Nallino eventually returned to Italy to take up the position of ordinary professor at the University La Sapienza of Rome,  where, in 1921, he had founded the Istituto per l'Oriente, which published the magazine Oriente Moderno. In 1933 he was named member of the Royal Academy of Arab Language in Cairo, and he was a member of the Italian Accademia Nazionale dei Lincei and of the Royal Academy of Italy. In 1938 he travelled for two months in the Arabic Peninsula, but he died shortly afterwards in Rome from a cardiac arrest after publishing only the first volumes of the studies about his trip.

Publications

Storia dei Musulmani di Sicilia by Michele Amari (1854).
Chrestimathia Qorani Arabica (1893).
Al-Battānī sive Albatenii opus astronomicum: ad fidem codicis Escurialensis Arabice editum, (1899 - 1907); the Latin title of al-Battānī's Kitāb Zīj al-Ṣābī’ ;  multi-volume scientific treatise on geography and astronomy  from Arabic manuscript with Latin annotations.

References

Bibliography

See also 
 Istituto per l'Oriente Carlo Alfonso Nallino

1872 births
1938 deaths
Italian Arabists
Italian orientalists
Writers from Turin
Members of the Royal Academy of Italy
Academic staff of the University of Palermo